Henri H. Stahl (also known as Henry H. Stahl or H. H. Stahl; 1901 – 9 September 1991) was a Romanian Marxist cultural anthropologist, ethnographer, sociologist, and social historian.

Biography
Born in Bucharest to a family of Alsatian and French-Swiss ancestry, he was the son of Henri Stahl (a promoter of stenography), as well as the younger brother of the sociologist and Social Democratic Party activist Şerban Voinea, and of the novelist Henriette Yvonne Stahl. He was married to Margareta, a known painter.

After completing law studies and being awarded a doctorate, Stahl became interested in the work of Dimitrie Gusti, and was consequently one of his most prominent collaborators. Joining the staff of the Department of Sociology, Ethics, Politics and Aesthetics at the University of Bucharest's Faculty of Letters and Philosophy (where he later became a professor emeritus), Stahl first assisted Gusti and Gheorghe Vlădescu-Răcoasa in the vast interdisciplinary enterprise of creating monographs dedicated to Romanian villages. In 1936, Gusti and Stahl, together with Victor Ion Popa, established the Bucharest Village Museum.

A member of the Criterion society, he made himself known for supporting Austromarxist positions, and, around 1932, was involved in a polemic with the Leninist Lucrețiu Pătrășcanu. In 1934, alongside Alexandru Cristian Tell, Mircea Eliade, Mircea Vulcănescu, and Petru Comarnescu, he sat on the board of Criterion magazine (which claimed not to be linked with the former society). He contributed to Dreapta, a nationalist magazine, but left it after the latter attacked Nicolae Iorga, and cited a conflict in political opinions. By 1938, contrary to the prevalent choices of his generation, Stahl declared himself an anti-fascist.

After World War II and the onset of the communist regime, Stahl was involved in projects to revive the sociology field; he was successful only after 1960, when he began working on Miron Constantinescu's staff at the Romanian Academy's Bibliotheca Historica Romaniae.

In 1990, he was elected a member of the Romanian Academy.

Works
Tehnica monografiei sociologice (1934)
Nerej, un village d'une région archaïque, 3 vols. (1939)
Sociologia satului devălmaş românesc (1946)
Contribuţii la studiul satelor devălmaşe româneşti, 3 vols. (1950-1965) 
Les anciennes communautés villageoises roumaines; asservissement et pénétration capitaliste (1966)
Sociologia "concretă" şi istorie, in Teorie şi metodă în știinţele sociale, Vol. VII: Filozofia istoriei. Studii, Editura Politică, Bucarest (1969)
Teoria şi practica investigărilor sociale, 2 vols. (1975) 
Traditional Romanian Village Communities: The Transition from the Communal to the Capitalist Mode of Production in the Danube Region, Cambridge University Press, 1979 
Teorii şi ipoteze privind sociologia orânduirii tributale, 1980 
Amintiri şi gânduri din vechea şcoală a monografiilor sociologice, 1981 
Eseuri critice. Despre cultura populară românească, 1983 
Dimitrie Gusti. Studii critice, 1986 
Probleme confuze în istoria socială a României, 1992
Zoltán Rostás, Monografia ca utopie. Interviuri cu Henri H. Stahl (interviews), 2000

Notes

References
Mircea Ioanid, "Oameni care mi-au fost dragi. H. H. Stahl", in Magazin Istoric, November 1995
Marta Petreu,  "Generaţia '27 între Holocaust şi Gulag" (I), in Revista 22, February 2003
Z. Ornea, Anii treizeci. Extrema dreaptă românească, Ed. Fundaţiei Culturale Române, Bucharest, 1995

External links
  Henri H. Stahl, Gânditori şi curente de istorie socială românească

1901 births
1991 deaths
Cultural anthropologists
Romanian ethnographers
Romanian people of French descent
Romanian Marxist historians
Marxist journalists
Titular members of the Romanian Academy
Romanian anthropologists
Romanian essayists
Romanian journalists
Romanian Marxists
Romanian memoirists
Romanian political scientists
Romanian sociologists
Romanian writers in French
Romanian people of Swiss descent
University of Bucharest alumni
Academic staff of the University of Bucharest
20th-century Romanian historians
20th-century essayists
20th-century anthropologists
20th-century journalists
20th-century memoirists
20th-century political scientists